Adnomination is the repetition of words with the same root word.

Example

References 

Poetic devices